Robert Lee Hayes (December 20, 1942 – September 18, 2002), nicknamed "Bullet Bob", was an Olympic gold medalist sprinter who then became an American football split end in the National Football League (NFL) for the Dallas Cowboys (for 11 seasons). Bob Hayes is the only athlete to win both an Olympic gold medal and a Super Bowl ring. An American track and field athlete, he was a two-sport stand-out in college in both track and football at Florida A&M University. Hayes was enshrined in the Dallas Cowboys Ring of Honor in 2001 and was selected for induction in the Pro Football Hall of Fame in January 2009. Hayes is the second Olympic gold medalist to be inducted to the Pro Football Hall of Fame, after Jim Thorpe. He once held the world record for the 70-yard dash (with a time of 6.9 seconds). He also is tied for the world's second-fastest time in the 60-yard dash.
He was once considered the "world's fastest human" by virtue of his multiple world records in the 60-yard, 100-yard, 220-yard, and Olympic 100-meter dashes. He was inducted into the United States Olympic Hall of Fame.

Early years
Hayes attended Matthew Gilbert High School in Jacksonville, where he was a backup halfback on the football team. The 1958 Gilbert High Panthers finished 12–0, winning the Florida High School Athletic Association black school state championship with a 14–7 victory over Dillard High School of Fort Lauderdale before more than 11,000 spectators. In times of racial segregation laws, their achievement went basically unnoticed, until 50 years later they were recognized as one of the best teams in Florida High School Athletic Association (FHSAA) history.

College career
Hayes was a highly recruited athlete, and accepted a football scholarship from Florida A&M University, a historically black college, where he excelled in track and field.

He never lost a race in the 100-yard or 100-meter competitions, but mainstream schools of the area still did not invite him to their sanctioned meets. In 1962 the University of Miami invited him to a meet on their campus, where he tied the world record of 9.2 seconds in the 100-yard dash, which had been set by Frank Budd of Villanova University the previous year. He also was the first person to break six seconds in the 60-yard dash with his indoor world record of 5.9 seconds.

In 1963, although he never used a traditional sprinter form, he broke the 100-yard dash record with a time of 9.1, a mark that would not be broken for eleven years (until Ivory Crockett ran a 9.0 in 1974). That same year, Hayes set the world best for 200 meters (20.5 seconds, although the time was never ratified) and ran the 220-yard dash in a time of 20.6 seconds (while running into an eight mph wind). He was selected to represent the United States in the 1964 Summer Olympics in Tokyo. His football coach Jake Gaither was not very high on giving Hayes time to train, which caused then president Lyndon B. Johnson to call him and insist he allow Hayes time off and to keep him healthy.

He was the AAU 100-yard dash champion three years running, from 1962–1964, and in 1964 was the NCAA champion in the 200-meter dash. He missed part of his senior year because of his Olympic bid for the gold medal.

In 1976, he was inducted into the inaugural class of the Florida A&M University Sports Hall of Fame. In 1996, he was inducted into the Southern Intercollegiate Athletic Conference Hall of Fame. In 2011, he was inducted into the Black College Football Hall of Fame.

Olympics

At the 1964 Summer Olympics, in Tokyo, Hayes had his finest hour as a sprinter. First, he won the 100m and in doing so tied the then world record in the 100 m with a time of 10.06 seconds, even though he was running in lane 1 which had, the day before, been used for the 20 km racewalk and this badly chewed up the cinder track. He also was running in borrowed spikes because one of his shoes had been kicked under the bed when he was playing with some friends and he didn't realize until he got there.  This was followed by a second gold medal in the 4×100 meter relay, which also produced a new World Record (39.06 seconds).

His come-from-behind win for the US team in the relay was one of the most memorable Olympic moments. Hand-timed between 8.5 and 8.9 seconds, his relay leg is the fastest in history.  Jocelyn Delecour, France's anchor leg runner, famously said to Paul Drayton before the relay final that, "You can't win, all you have is Bob Hayes."  Drayton was able to reply afterwards, "That's all we need." The race was also Hayes' last as a track and field athlete, as he permanently switched to football after it, aged only 21.

In some of the first meets to be timed with experimental fully automatic timing, Hayes was the first man to break ten seconds for the 100 meters, albeit with a 5.3 m/s wind assistance in the semi-finals of the 1964 Olympics.  His time was recorded at 9.91 seconds.  Jim Hines officially broke 10 seconds at the high altitude of Mexico City, Mexico in 1968 (and on a synthetic track) with a wind-legal 9.95 which stood as the world record for almost 15 years.  The next to surpass Hayes at a low altitude Olympics was Carl Lewis in 1984 when he won in 9.99, some 20 years later (though Hasely Crawford equaled the time in 1976).

Until the Tokyo Olympics, world records were measured by officials with stopwatches, measured to the nearest tenth of a second.  Although fully automatic timing was used in Tokyo, the times were given the appearance of manual timing.  This was done by subtracting 0.05 seconds from the automatic time and rounding to the nearest tenth of a second, making Hayes' time of 10.06 seconds convert to 10.0 seconds, despite the fact that the officials with stopwatches had measured Hayes' time to be 9.9 seconds, and the average difference between manual and automatic times was typically 0.15 to 0.20 seconds.  This unique method of determining the official time therefore denied Hayes the record of being the first to officially record 9.9 seconds for the 100 meters.  The first official times of 9.9 seconds were recorded at the "Night of Speed" in 1968.

Professional football career

Dallas Cowboys
The Dallas Cowboys selected Hayes in the seventh round (88th overall) of the 1964 NFL Draft with a future draft pick, which allowed the team to draft him before his college eligibility was over, taking a chance that the Olympic sprinter with unrefined football skills could excel as a wide receiver. He was also selected by the Denver Broncos in the 14th round  (105th overall) of the 1964 AFL Draft, with a future selection. The bet paid off, due to his amazing feats in cleats. Hayes has been credited by many with forcing the NFL to develop a zone defense and the bump and run to attempt to contain him.

Hayes' first two seasons were most successful, during which he led the NFL both times in receiving touchdowns with 12 and 13 touchdowns, respectively. In 1966 Hayes caught six passes for 195 yards against the New York Giants at the Cotton Bowl. Later, in the Dallas Cowboys-Washington Redskins match-up, Hayes caught nine passes for 246 yards (a franchise record until Miles Austin broke it with a 250-yard performance on October 11, 2009, against the Kansas City Chiefs).  Hayes' speed forced other teams to go to a zone since no single player could keep up with him.  Spreading the defense out in hopes of containing Hayes allowed the Cowboys' talented running game to flourish, rushers Don Perkins, Calvin Hill, Walt Garrison and Duane Thomas taking advantage of the diminished coverage at the line of scrimmage.  In the 1967 season, Hayes led the NFL in punt return yards, and went on to set an NFL playoff record with 141 punt return yards in Dallas' 52-14 win over the Cleveland Browns.  Hayes also caught 5 passes for 145 yards in that game, including an 86-yard touchdown catch.

Hayes is also infamous for two events, both involving the NFL championship games in 1966 and 1967, both against the Packers. In the 1966 game, on the last meaningful play of the game, Hayes missed an assignment of blocking linebacker Dave Robinson, which resulted in Don Meredith nearly being sacked by Robinson and as a result throwing a desperation pass into the end zone that was intercepted by Tom Brown. In the 1967 NFL championship, the "Ice Bowl" played on New Year's Eve, 1967, Hayes was alleged to have inadvertently disclosed whether the upcoming play was a pass or run because on running plays he kept his hands inside his pants to keep them warm and the Green Bay defense knew they didn't need to cover him.

On July 17, 1975, he was traded to the San Francisco 49ers in exchange for a third round draft choice (#73-Duke Fergerson).

Hayes wore No. 22 with the Cowboys, which would later be worn by running back Emmitt Smith.

San Francisco 49ers
In 1975 with the San Francisco 49ers, Hayes teamed up with Gene Washington in the starting lineup. On October 23, he was waived after not playing up to expectations, in order to make room for wide receiver Terry Beasley.

Multiple offensive threat
In addition to receiving, Hayes returned punts for the Cowboys and was the NFL's leading punt returner in 1968 with a 20.8 yards per return average and two touchdowns, including a 90 yarder against the Pittsburgh Steelers. He was named to the Pro Bowl three times and First-team All-Pro twice and Second-team All-Pro twice.  He helped Dallas win five Eastern Conference titles, two NFC titles, played in two Super Bowls, and was instrumental in Dallas' first-ever Super Bowl victory after the 1971 season, making Hayes the only person to win both an Olympic gold medal and a Super Bowl ring.  Later in his career, as defenses improved playing zone and the bump and run was refined, Hayes' value was as a decoy rather than a deep threat.

Cowboy records
Hayes was the second player (after Franklin Clarke) in the history of the Dallas Cowboys franchise to surpass 1,000 yards (ground or air) in a single season, and he did that in his rookie year by finishing with 1,003 yards.  Also during his rookie year, he led the team with 46 receptions and set franchise records for total touchdowns (13) and total receiving touchdowns (12).  He finished his 11-year career with 371 receptions for 7,414 yards and 71 touchdowns, giving him an impressive 20 yards per catch average (his yards per catch average remains a franchise record, while his touchdown reception record stood until 2017, when it was broken by Dez Bryant.) He also rushed for 68 yards and two touchdowns, gained 581 yards on 23 kickoff returns, and returned 104 punts for 1,158 yards and three touchdowns.

In 1965 he also started a streak (1965–1966) of seven consecutive games with at least a touchdown catch, which still stands as a Cowboys record shared with Franklin Clarke (1961–1962), Terrell Owens (2007) and Dez Bryant (2012).

His 7,295 receiving yards are the sixth-most in Dallas Cowboys history. To this day, Hayes holds ten regular-season receiving records, four punt return records and 22 overall franchise marks, making him one of the greatest receivers to ever play for the Cowboys.

In 2004, he was named to the Professional Football Researchers Association Hall of Very Good in the association's second HOVG class

Death
On September 18, 2002, Hayes died in his hometown Jacksonville of kidney failure, after battling prostate cancer and liver ailments.

Pro Football Hall of Fame

2004 controversy
Hayes was close to being inducted into the Pro Football Hall of Fame in 2004, but was denied the opportunity in the final round of decision making.  The decision was marred by controversy, with many claiming that the Hall of Fame Senior Selection Committee had a bias against members of the Dallas Cowboys and other NFL teams.  Others believe Hayes' legal and drug use issues marred his chances. Shortly after the announcement of the new 2004 Hall of Fame members, long-time Sports Illustrated writer Paul Zimmerman resigned from the Selection Committee in protest of the decision to leave Hayes out of the Hall. Zimmerman eventually returned as a Hall of Fame voter.

2009 induction
On August 27, 2008, Hayes was named as one of two senior candidates for the 2009 Hall of Fame election.  On Saturday, January 31, 2009, he was selected as a member of the Pro Football Hall of Fame's Class of 2009.

The next day Lucille Hester, who claimed to be Hayes's sister, released a letter she said he had drafted three years before he died, on October 29, 1999, in case he did not live to see his induction. Its full text read:

You know I am not sure I am going to be around if I get into the Pro Football Hall of Fame so you must read this for me, I am not sure, I guess I am feeling sorry for myself at this time but you must remember everything I want you to do and say. Mother said you would do what I want because you always did. So read this for me.

I would like to thank everyone who supported me to get into the NFL Hall of Fame, the Dallas Cowboys organization, all of my team mates and everyone who played for the Cowboys, (thank the San Francisco 49rs   too). Thank the fans all around the country and the world, thank the committee who voted for me and also the ones who may did not vote for me, thank Mother and my family, thank Roger Stauback  and tell all my teammates I love them dearly.

Thank the Pro Football Hall of Fame, all the NFL teams and players, Florida A&M University, thank everyone who went to Mathew  Gilbert High School, thank everyone in Jacksonville and Florida and everyone especially on the East Side of Jacksonville. Thank everyone in the City of Dallas and in Texas and just thank everyone in the whole world.

I love you all.

Delivered by Hester in front of hundreds and a national cable television audience, the moment was described as "... one of the most compelling and touching scenes the Hall of Fame has seen."  Shortly after, it was discovered that the supposedly signed letter was printed in the Calibri font, which was not released to the public until five years after Hayes' death. Some family members disputed Lucille Hester's claim to be related to Bob, and took steps to ensure she was not part of the Hall of Fame ceremony.

On August 8, 2009, Hayes was inducted into the Pro Football Hall of Fame. Roger Staubach, Hayes' Dallas Cowboy teammate, along with Hayes' son Bob Hayes Jr., unveiled the bust, which was sculpted by Scott Myers. On hand were six members of Bob's Gilbert High School championship team. He was later inducted into the Texas Track and Field Coaches Hall of Fame, Class of 2017.

References

Further reading
 Wallechinsky, David (2004).  The Complete Book of the Summer Olympics, Toronto: Sport Classic Books.

External links

 
 
 
 
 
 
 
 
 

1942 births
2002 deaths
African-American players of American football
American football wide receivers
American male sprinters
World record setters in athletics (track and field)
Athletes (track and field) at the 1964 Summer Olympics
Dallas Cowboys players
San Francisco 49ers players
Eastern Conference Pro Bowl players
Florida A&M Rattlers football players
Florida A&M Rattlers track and field athletes
Olympic gold medalists for the United States in track and field
Medalists at the 1964 Summer Olympics
Players of American football from Jacksonville, Florida
Deaths from prostate cancer
Deaths from cancer in Florida
Pro Football Hall of Fame inductees
Track and field athletes from Florida
Track and field athletes in the National Football League
USA Outdoor Track and Field Championships winners
USA Indoor Track and Field Championships winners
20th-century African-American sportspeople
21st-century African-American people